The CB650 custom is a motorcycle made by Honda between 1980 and 1981, ending as the CB650 LC "Luxury Custom" in 1982.

The styling features that separated the custom from the standard CB650 are:
Highlighted, black Honda ComStar wheels
4-4 exhaust pipes
Pull-back "wheelbarrow" handle bars
Extended front air-forks
Vibration-resistant mirrors
Custom side-emblems
Chrome covered rear-shocks

The CB650LC was a Japan-only variant released in 1982 with slightly lower overall height and ground clearance, with hydraulic double disc front brakes and modified rear fairing.

References

Honda motorcycles
Motorcycles introduced in 1980
Custom motorcycles
Standard motorcycles